The 2022 UMB World Three-cushion Championship is the 74th edition of the tournament. It takes place from 9 to 13 November 2022 in Donghae City, South Korea.

See also

2022 UMB World Three-cushion Championship for National Teams

References

External links

UMB

UMB World Three-cushion Championship
UMB
UMB
International sports competitions hosted by South Korea
UMB